Francis Harper (17 November 1886 – 17 November 1972) was an American naturalist known for the study of the 18th-century American naturalists John and William Bartram. His research included studies of the Okefenokee Swamp and fieldwork in the north eastern United States and in northern Canada, and authored new combinations for two species originally described by William Bartram, Garberia heterophylla and Roystonea elata.

Biography 

Harper received an A.B. in 1914 and a Ph.D. in 1925 from Cornell University. He taught briefly at Swarthmore College, but beyond that he worked for museums, government agencies and research agencies.

In 1914 Harper made his first trip to northern Canada on an expedition to Lake Athabasca working as a zoologist for the Geological Survey of Canada.

Between 1917 and 1919 Harper served as a rodent control officer in France with the United States Army's 79th Division.  He returned to Athabasca in 1920, Nueltin Lake in southern Keewatin in 1947 and the Ungava Peninsula in 1953, his last trip north.  Harper published notable works on the caribou of Keewatin, the birds of the Ungava Peninsula, and the Montagnais of the Ungava.

Research 
From 1917 through the 1950s Harper spent significant time researching the work of the early North American naturalists John Bartram and his son William Bartram. Harper traced the Bartrams' travels in the American South and helped revive both scientific and popular interest in the Bartrams' work, while keeping notebooks on his fieldworks as early as in 1912. Harper's research into the Bartrams was funded by grants from the John Bartram Association in Philadelphia, the American Philosophical Society, and the Guggenheim Foundation among others.

Extensive publications on both of the Bartrams included annotated editions of John Bartram's "Diary of a Journey through the Carolinas, Georgia, and Florida 1765-1766"; William Bartram's "Report to Dr. John Fothergill 1773-1774" and an annotated The Travels of William Bartram: Naturalist’s Edition first published in Philadelphia in 1791.

Harper published on the mammals and folklore of the Okefenokee Swamp, including recordings of the local music.  He also published on the "extinct and vanishing" mammals of the old world. His papers are held in the Kenneth Spencer Research Library at the University of Kansas.

Publications
Harper authored about 135 publications including:

"The Vultur Sacra of William Bartram", written by William Bartram, edited by F. Harper. Swarthmore, Pa, 1936? ,  
"The Bartram trail through the southeastern states", Chicago, 1939.  
"Some works of Bartram, Daudin, Latreille, and Sonnini, and their bearing upon North American herpetological nomenclature", Notre Dame: Indiana University Press, 1940.
"William Bartram's names of birds", Rochester: , 1942? 
"John Bartram's Diary ; and William Bartram's Travels, edited by F. Harper, "Transactions of American Philosophy Society", n.s., 33 (1-2), Philadelphia: APS, 1944. 
"Diary of a Journey through the Carolinas, Georgia, and Florida, from July 1, 1765 to April 10, 1766" edited by F. Harper.
"Travels in Georgia and Florida, 1773-74. A Report to Dr. John Fothergill" edited by Francis Harper.
The Travels of William Bartram: Naturalist’s Edition, edited by Francis Harper, University of Georgia Press: (30 September 1998), .

Bibliography

Footnotes

Notes

References

Further reading 
 The American Committee and the First Inventory of Extinction in "Nature's Ghosts: Confronting Extinction from the Age of Jefferson to the Age of Ecology", Barrow, Mark V., University of Chicago Press, 2009.  pp. 159–163. ,  
 "Bartram Heritage: A Study of the Life of William Bartram : Including the Report to the Heritage Conservation and Recreation Service, U.S. Department of the Interior", by Bartram Trail Conference ; Brad Sanders, 1979. 
 "John and William Bartram's America" by Cruickshank, Helen Gere, Nueva York : The American Museum of Natural History, 1957. 
 Chapter 5: Okefenokee Swampers in "Trembling Earth: A Cultural History of the Okefenokee Swamp", Nelson, Megan Kate, University of Georgia Press, 2005. 
 "On Harper's Trail: Roland McMillan Harper, Pioneering Botanist of the Southern Coastal Plain", Shores, Elizabeth F., University of Georgia Press, 2008. On Francis' brother Roland, who sometimes accompanied Francis and often discussed with him as a botanist on natural history.

External links
 
 
 Francis Harper Papers at the Kenneth Spencer Research Library, University of Kansas

1886 births
1972 deaths
American biologists
Cornell University alumni
People from Southbridge, Massachusetts
20th-century biologists